Siliguri Junction–Rangtong–Siliguri Evening Safari  was a narrow-gauge tourist special steam engine powered train in India that does a round trip between  and Rangtong and back to Siliguri in the Indian state of West Bengal. The train belongs to the Northeast Frontier Railway zone of Indian Railways.
 The train was cancelled in March 2022, due to poor occupancy and has not restarted since.

Route
For reverse direction, the train starts from Rangtong at 16:40 and reaches Sukna at 17:20. After a five-minute, halt it again travels from Sukna and reaches  at 18:05. Through its journey through narrow gauge, the train passes through beautiful Mahananda Wildlife Sanctuary, tea gardens, hills, valleys, rivers etc. It provides once in a lifetime experience for the travellers in the steam engine powered train. The train runs entirely in Darjeeling district of West Bengal.

Traction
The train is hauled by Steam Engine of Darjeeling Loco Shed for its entire journey.

Loco Reversal
The train reverses its direction in Rangtong Railway station.

See also
New Jalpaiguri–Alipurduar Tourist Special

References

Tourist attractions in West Bengal
2019 establishments in West Bengal
Northeast Frontier Railway zone
Rail transport in West Bengal
Transport in Siliguri
Alipurduar railway division
2 ft gauge railways in India